Khonda is a village in Ajmer District, Rajasthan, India.

References 

Villages in Ajmer district